
Gmina Żnin is an urban-rural gmina (administrative district) in Żnin County, Kuyavian-Pomeranian Voivodeship, in north-central Poland.

Villages
Apart from the town of Żnin, Gmina Żnin contains the villages and settlements of: 
 
 Bekanówka
 Białożewin
 Bożejewice
 Bożejewiczki
 Brzyskorzystew
 Brzyskorzystewko
 Cerekwica
 Chomiąża Księża
 Chomiąża Księża-Leśniczówka
 Daronice
 Dobrylewo
 Dochanowo
 Gorzyce
 Jadowniki Bielskie
 Jadowniki Rycerskie
 Januszkowo
 Jaroszewo
 Kaczkówko
 Kaczkowo
 Kępa
 Kierzkowo
 Murczyn
 Murczynek
 Nadborowo
 Nowiny
 Nowiny-Leśniczówka
 Obrona Leśna
 Paryż
 Podgórzyn
 Podobowice
 Probostwo
 Redczyce
 Rydlewo
 Sarbinowo
 Sielec
 Skarbienice
 Słabomierz
 Sławoszewo
 Słębowo
 Sobiejuchy
 Sulinowo
 Świerczewo
 Uścikowo
 Ustaszewo
 Wawrzynki
 Wenecja
 Wilczkowo
 Wójcin
 Żnin-Wieś

Neighbouring gminas
Gmina Żnin is bordered by the gminas of Barcin, Dąbrowa, Damasławek, Gąsawa, Janowiec Wielkopolski, Kcynia, Łabiszyn, Rogowo, Szubin and Wapno.

References
Polish official population figures 2006

Znin
Żnin County